Ka River (also known as Gulbin Ka River) is a river in the northern part of Nigeria.

References

Rivers of Nigeria